Laurent Delorge (born 21 July 1979) is a Belgian former footballer. He formerly served AA Gent, Coventry City, Lierse SK, RSC Anderlecht, ADO Den Haag, Ajax and Roda JC Kerkrade.

Career 
After scoring five goals in ten appearances in his Jupiler League debut season for AA Gent he was transferred to Coventry City who at the time were playing in the FA Premier League.

Delorge signed for Coventry midway through the 1998/99 season, however he didn't make his first appearance for the club until 29 January 2000, when he came on as a substitute in Coventry's defeat to Charlton Athletic in the FA Cup. His next appearance didn't come until 15 September 2001. However, in this game he made an instant impact; coming off the bench to score the winner against Sheffield United with practically his first touch of the game. He fell out with manager Gordon Strachan but was recalled when Roland Nilsson took over. He ultimately failed in his bid to become a first team regular but in 2001/02 he made 28 starts, scoring 4 goals.

When Lierse SK offered him a contract to return to the Jupiler League in his home country he ended his foreign career straight away and soon became one of their key players. Eventually this led to a transfer to RSC Anderlecht for the 2005/06 season.

At Anderlecht he was fired on 17 February 2006 for alleged 'wrongdoing' with former club Lierse SK in conjunction with the match-fixing investigation in Belgian football. Not much later he signed a 3-year contract deal with Dutch Eredivisie side ADO Den Haag. In a disappointing season ADO was unable to remain in the Eredivisie and were relegated to the Eerste Divisie. Delorge however was offered a contract at Ajax and signed a 2-year contract on 10 May 2007.

In his first year in Amsterdam he played four matches, but in his second year he did not play once. In the winter of 2009, Roda JC contracted the disappointed Delorge, who became a first team regular at the Eredivisie club before his retirement in July 2013.

Statistics

References

Sources
Voetbal International website and 2007/2008 presentation magazine

External links
Voetbal International profile
Ajax Inside Profile

1979 births
Living people
Belgian footballers
Belgium under-21 international footballers
Association football midfielders
K.A.A. Gent players
Coventry City F.C. players
Lierse S.K. players
R.S.C. Anderlecht players
ADO Den Haag players
AFC Ajax players
Roda JC Kerkrade players
English Football League players
Belgian Pro League players
Eredivisie players
Belgian expatriate footballers
Expatriate footballers in England
Belgian expatriate sportspeople in England
Expatriate footballers in the Netherlands
Belgian expatriate sportspeople in the Netherlands
Footballers from Flemish Brabant
Sportspeople from Leuven